In Greek mythology, Cisus, or Ceisus, son of Temenus, was a king of Argos.

Temenus had left his kingdom to his son in law Deiphontes even though he had natural sons of his own. In consequence of this, Deiphontes was slain by the stratagems of the sons of Temenus, the eldest of whom, being named Cisus, took possession of the kingdom.

By this time, however, the Argives became advocates for liberty of speech and laws of their own making, and they diminished the power of their king so much that by the end of his reign, Cisus had become a king in name only. He was succeeded by Lacidaus.

Sources

 Bibliotheca 2.8.5
 Pausanias, 2.26.2, 2.28.3

Kings of Argos